Bertiella  may refer to:
 Bertiella (fungus), a genus of fungi in the family Teichosporaceae
 Bertiella (tapeworm), a genus of tapeworms in the family Anoplocephalidae